Hogeye is an unincorporated community in Hunt County, in the U.S. state of Texas.

History
The first settlement at Hogeye was made in the 1850s. According to tradition, the community's name stems from a fancied resemblance of the Eye of Providence on a local Masonic hall to a hog's eye.

References

Unincorporated communities in Texas
Unincorporated communities in Hunt County, Texas